William Griffiths (6 September 1932 – 13 December 2010) was an Australian boxer. He competed in the men's lightweight event at the 1956 Summer Olympics.

References

External links
 

1932 births
2010 deaths
Australian male boxers
Olympic boxers of Australia
Boxers at the 1956 Summer Olympics
Place of birth missing
Lightweight boxers